Raoul Francisco Eustaquio da Luz was a Hong Kong international lawn bowler.

Bowls career
He won a silver medal in the fours at the 1954 British Empire and Commonwealth Games in Vancouver, with Alfred Coates, Robert Gourlay and his brother Jose da Luz.

He also competed in the 1958 British Empire and Commonwealth Games in Cardiff, Wales.

Personal life
Of Portuguese origin he was born in Hong Kong and became a US citizen in 1965.

References

1892 births
1988 deaths
Hong Kong male bowls players
Commonwealth Games silver medallists for Hong Kong
Commonwealth Games medallists in lawn bowls
Bowls players at the 1954 British Empire and Commonwealth Games
Bowls players at the 1958 British Empire and Commonwealth Games
Medallists at the 1954 British Empire and Commonwealth Games